Company D 1st Battalion 181st Infantry Regiment is a heavy weapons company in the 181st Infantry Regiment. It provides anti-armor and heavy machine gun support to the battalion operations. In the National Guard, companies sometimes have two histories. They share the history of the regiment to which they are assigned, but also may have a unique company history and lineage. Therefore, Company D 1-181 IN shares the long history of the 181st Infantry Regiment (United States). This site concentrates on the unique history of Company D as a militia / National Guard company in Whitinsville, MA. The company traces its history to 1864 during the Civil War, when it was first mustered as the Company I, 5th Massachusetts Militia. It later served as a federalized Massachusetts National Guard regiment with the U.S. Army during the Spanish–American War, Mexican Border Campaign, World War I and World War II. Most recently the Company D has served in New Orleans following Hurricane Katrina, in Iraq and in Afghanistan.

History

Formation and Civil War
The present Company D 1-181 IN, was first mustered as Company I of the 5th Massachusetts Infantry on 18 April 1864. The company saw service for one hundred days, and was sent to Baltimore, Md., where it did guard duty at Fort McHenry, Fort Marshall, Federal Hill, and other places.

National Guard and overseas service
In 1894 it was named the Hudson Light Guards.

In June 1898 The Hudson Light Guards was mobilized for the war with Spain and served at Gunville, South Carolina.

The Land forces of the Massachusetts Volunteer Militia were redesignated as the Massachusetts National Guard on 15 November 1907.

On 26 June 1916, Company M of the 5th Mass. Infantry was mobilized for service on the Mexican Border at El Paso, Texas.

World War I
In the First World War the company sent many of its soldiers to Company M of the 101st Infantry, the remainder of the Company served in France as part of the 3rd Pioneer Infantry Regiment. The pioneer regiments included such specialists as mechanics, carpenters, farriers and masons. They were supposed to work under the direction of the Engineers to build roads, bridges, gun emplacements and camps "within the sound of the guns." They received standard infantry training so that they could defend themselves, but there are very few documented instances of any pioneer troops unslinging their rifles. Demobilized in July 1919 at Camp Dodge, IA.

In 1923 the Company was redesignated as Company L 1-181 IN.

World War II
The company was mobilized in January 1941 for one year of training with the Yankee Division. The year of training ended in December 1941 but the company's service continued after the Japanese attack on Pearl Harbor brought the United States into the Second World War.
Company L was relieved from duty with the 26th (Yankee) Infantry Division and served with the 181st Infantry Regiment on coastal defense duty until January 1944, when the 181st Infantry was broken up with the soldiers going to be infantry replacements in the Italian Campaign.

In 1946, The 181st Infantry was re-established. The WWII battle honors and service in the Army of Occupation in Austria of the 328th Infantry were credited to the 181st Infantry. The Company served through the Cold War.

Later service
After World War II the company in Hudson became a tank company assigned to the 110th Armor and 110th Cavalry Regiments. In 2005 The company became Company D 1-181 Infantry.

In September 2005, Company mobilized as an element of JTF Yankee for rescue and security operations in New Orleans following Hurricane Katrina.

In May 2007, D Company mobilized in support of Operation Iraqi Freedom. The unit's mission was to operate as a Personnel Security Detail for the U.S.
Ambassador to Iraq, State Department personnel, Baghdad Provincial Reconstruction Team and the U.N.'S Special Representative to Iraq.

In August 2010, Company D 1-181 IN deployed for one year of service with the International Security Force in Afghanistan in support of Operation Enduring Freedom.  The company coordinated force protection at Camp Phoenix and conducted security operations in Ghazni, Zabul and Farrah (detachment from Arizona National Guard) Provinces.

Battles
 American Civil War, I Company, 5th Massachusetts Infantry
 Spanish–American War, M Company, 5th Massachusetts Infantry
 Mexican Border campaign, M Company, 5th Massachusetts Infantry
 World War I, 3rd Pioneer Infantry Regiment
 Champagne Marne
 Saint Mihiel
 Meuse Argonne
 World War II, L Company, 328th Infantry Regiment (United States)
 Northern France
 Rhineland
 Ardennes-Alsace
 Central Europe

Global War on Terror, Company D 1-181 IN
 Iraq War
 Afghanistan War (2001–2021)

Unit decorations

See also
 181st Infantry Regiment (United States)
 Headquarters Company 1-181 Infantry (Wellington Rifles)
 Company A 1-181 Infantry (Springfield Rifles)
 Company B 1-181 Infantry
 Company C 1-181 Infantry (Cambridge City Guard)
 1181 Forward Support Company

Notes

References

Military units and formations in Massachusetts
Companies of the United States Army National Guard